Leposava Glušica (born 9 July 1982) is a Serbian handballer who plays for Békéscsabai ENKSE. She joined the East Hungarian team on a one-year contract in 2010 and became a free agent in the summer of 2011, however, not much later she re-joined the purple-whites on a short-term deal. Her current contract runs until 31 December 2011.

References

1982 births
Living people
People from Ruma
Serbian female handball players
Expatriate handball players
Serbian expatriate sportspeople in Hungary
Békéscsabai Előre NKSE players